Trethellan Water is a hamlet south of Lanner, Cornwall, England, United Kingdom.

References

Hamlets in Cornwall